Winseler is a commune and village in north-western Luxembourg.

Administrative organization and population
It is part of the canton of Wiltz.

, the village of Winseler, which lies in the east of the commune, has a population of 120. The (commune) of Winseler has a population of 1116.

Following the last Luxembourg communal elections in 2017, Romain Schroeder was returned as Mayor, and Charles Pauly as Alderman. Other members of the Council include, Roland Esch, Christophe Hansen, Paul Kayser, Fernand Majerus, Marc Schmitz, and Will Toex.

Other towns within the commune
Other towns within the commune include Berlé, Doncols, Noertrange, Pommerloch, Grummelscheid, Schleif and Sonlez.

Population

Linguistic background
Like Lasauvage in the south of Luxembourg, Doncols and Sonlez, were formerly known as French-speaking (or, strictly, in their cases, Walloon-speaking) villages.

See also
 Doncols#Historical and linguistic backgrounds

References

External links
 

Communes in Wiltz (canton)
Towns in Luxembourg